The SCSI Trade Association, or SCSITA (sometimes STA), is an industry trade group which exists to promote the use of SCSI technology.  It was formed in 1996.  , sponsor members include HP, Intel, LSI Logic, PMC-Sierra, and Seagate.   Requirements for membership are (1) manufacturing or selling SCSI related products or services and (2) paying dues and fees, which start at $4500/year.

The SCSITA does not define SCSI technical standards; that is the job of the INCITS T10 Committee.  Rather, SCSITA promotes the use of SCSI and establishes standard marketing terminology and trademarks.  They also foster vendor inter-operability.

See also 
 SCSI – Small Computer System Interface
 INCITS – International Committee for Information Technology Standards

Notes

External links 
 SCSI Trade Association – Official website

SCSI
Technology trade associations
Trade associations based in the United States